Jesenské is a village and municipality in the Rimavská Sobota District of the Banská Bystrica Region of southern Slovakia.

History
The first mention is from 1274. In 1424, the village is noticed as property of the Feledys. As early as the Middle Ages, the village was important agricultural centre of the region. In 1553 was the village pillaged. From 1938 to 1945, it belonged to Hungary. Jesenské had been in 20th century seat of the Jesenské District.

Economy and infrastructure
Municipal office had been built in 1936. The village is important railway crossroad, as the Bratislava-Košice line crosses with a Jesenské-Tisovec line. In 2012 small reconstruction of the village center began. In 1922 a football club was established, which is one of the best sport clubs in the village.

See also
 List of municipalities and towns in Slovakia

References

Genealogical resources
The records for genealogical research are available at the state archive "Statny Archiv in Banska Bystrica, Slovakia"

 Roman Catholic church records (births/marriages/deaths): 1768-1878 (parish A)
 Reformed church records (births/marriages/deaths): 1786-1878 (parish B)

External links
 
Jesenské news at www.sme.sk
http://www.jesenske.gemer.org
http://www.e-obce.sk/obec/jesenske/jesenske.html
Surnames of living people in Jesenske

Villages and municipalities in Rimavská Sobota District
Hungarian communities in Slovakia